General elections were held in Italy on 20 November 1870, with a second round of voting on 27 November. They were a snap election, called by Prime Minister Giovanni Lanza to take advantage by the Capture of Rome and to give parliamentary representation to the future capital of Italy.

Only 530,018 men of a total population of around 26 million were entitled to vote. They were largely aristocrats representing rentiers from the north of the country, and held moderate political views including loyalty to the crown and low government spending.

Campaign
The Historical Right was led by the Prime Minister of Italy, Giovanni Lanza, a conservative politician from Piedmont.

The bloc of the Historical Left was led by Urbano Rattazzi, a liberal politician and former Prime Minister, who led the left-wing for more than a decade.

The electoral result was controversial; in terms of percentages, Prime Minister Giovanni Lanza fully exploited the prestige of the Capture of Rome against his parliamentary opponents. However, the turnout further declined after the Non expedit of Pope Pius IX, so that less than 1% of the total population of the country took part to this election. The newly completed Italian State so revealed itself as a strict oligarchy with a deep fracture with its same population, creating a damage which was never really repaired.

After the election, Lanza was confirmed Prime Minister by the King.

Parties and leaders

Results

Notes

References

General elections in Italy
Italy
General
Italy